Gmina Wojciechów is a rural gmina (administrative district) in Lublin County, Lublin Voivodeship, in eastern Poland.

Villages
Gmina Wojciechów contains the villages and settlements of Góra, Halinówka, Ignaców, Łubki, Łubki-Kolonia, Łubki-Szlachta, Maszki, Miłocin, Nowy Gaj, Palikije, Palikije Drugie, Sporniak, Stary Gaj, Stasin, Szczuczki, Wojciechów, Wojciechów-Kolonia Piąta and Wojciechów-Kolonia Pierwsza.

Neighbouring gminas
Gmina Wojciechów is bordered by the gminas of Bełżyce, Jastków, Konopnica, Nałęczów, Poniatowa and Wąwolnica.

References

Wojciechow
Lublin County